Zadrže is a settlement immediately west of Šmarje pri Jelšah in eastern Slovenia. The entire area of the Municipality of Šmarje pri Jelšah was traditionally part of Styria and is now included in the Savinja Statistical Region.

References

External links
Zadrže at Geopedia

Populated places in the Municipality of Šmarje pri Jelšah